This is a list of communes of Luxembourg by area. Cities are given in italics.

See also

List of communes of Luxembourg by highest point
List of communes of Luxembourg by lowest point
List of communes of Luxembourg by population
List of communes of Luxembourg by population density

References

Area